Acianthera aberrans is a species of orchid plant native to Costa Rica, Ecuador, Panamá.

References 

aberrans
Flora of Costa Rica
Flora of Ecuador
Flora of Panama
Plants described in 1978